XHVJL-FM is a radio station on 91.9 FM in Puerto Vallarta, Jalisco, Mexico. It is part of the C7 state network of Jalisco with its own local programming.

History
XHVJL was most recently permitted in 1999, but it was put on air in 1994.

It is the sister to XEJLV-AM 1080, which was put on the air at the same time but no longer appears in IFT tables.

References

Radio stations in Jalisco
Puerto Vallarta
Radio stations established in 1994
1994 establishments in Mexico